The Hughes AN/TSQ-51 Air Defense Command and Coordination System was a transportable electronic fire distribution center for automated command and control of remote Nike missile launch batteries.  The radar netting system replace the vacuum tube AN/FSG-1 in 6 United States Missile Master bunkers after the upgrade was approved by the United States Department of Defense in 1963; and additional deployments were at Homestead-Miami, Florida, and Providence, Rhode Island, to replace Battery Integration and Radar DIsplay Equipment (BIRDIE) systems; as well as at San Francisco.  As with the AN/FSG-1, the AN/TSQ-51 could provide fire control for 24 Nike batteries, but the smaller AN/TSQ-51 could be fielded in 2 trailers.

References

United States Army equipment
1964 establishments in the United States
1964 in computing
1964 in military history
1967 disestablishments in the United States
1967 in military history
Cold War military computer systems of the United States
Hughes Aircraft Company